The Executive Policy Bureau of the Workers' Party of Korea (WPK)(정무국), officially the Executive Policy Bureau of the 7th Central Committee of the Workers' Party of Korea(조선로동당 7차 중앙위원회 중앙정무국), was established at the 7th WPK Congress on 9 May 2016 and abolished at the 8th WPK Congress on 10 January 2021.

Members

References

Executive Policy Bureau of the Workers' Party of Korea